Madina Colony may refer to:

 Madina Colony (New Karachi Town), Union Council (U.C. # 7) of New Karachi Town, Karachi, Sindh, Pakistan
 Madina Colony (Orangi Town), Union Council (U.C. # 5) of Orangi Town, Karachi, Sindh, Pakistan
 Madina Colony (Naseera), Union Council Sehna of Kharian, Kharian Cantt, Gujrat, Pakistan